Blendon and Penhill is an electoral ward in the London Borough of Bexley. Representing part of the Old Bexley and Sidcup Parliamentary constituency, three Councillors Graham D’Amiral, Steven Hall and Nick O’Hare were returned at the 2014 local government election.

References
 Blendon and Penhill ward profile
 Old Bexley & Sidcup Conservative Party

Wards of the London Borough of Bexley